is a former Japanese cyclist. He competed in the 1000m time trial, and the men's sprint events at the 1964 Summer Olympics. From 1965 to 1996, he was a professional keirin cyclist with 455 wins and 8 championships over his career.

References

1943 births
Living people
Japanese male cyclists
Olympic cyclists of Japan
Cyclists at the 1964 Summer Olympics
Place of birth missing (living people)
Keirin cyclists